Chile–Malaysia relations refers to foreign relations between Malaysia and Chile. Chile has an embassy in Kuala Lumpur, and Malaysia has an embassy in Santiago. Both countries are members of APEC.

History 

Relations between the two countries was established on 22 May 1979, with the embassy of Chile been opened in 1989.

Economic relations 
Relations between both countries is mainly based on trade, with Malaysia become Chile's main trading partner in Southeast Asia with the total trade in 1990 reaching $800 million. In the same year, a special scheme to help foreign businessmen to visit Malaysia are being proposed by Malaysian Deputy Prime Minister Ghafar Baba following his visit to Chile. Both Chile and Malaysia agreed to set-up a joint committee to co-operated in the information and broadcasting field in 1994. Economic relations between the two countries are based on the South-South co-operation and pacts on bilateral trade was signed in 1995. In 2009, the total trade between Chile and Malaysia is $336 million with the total Malaysian export to Chile was $16.8 million while the import with $148.7 million. Chilean cuisine are started to be promoted to Malaysia in the same year. A memorandum of understanding (MoU) to improve air links was signed in 2010, with the tariff on trade agreement was scrapped in the same year. The two countries free trade agreement taking effect from 2011, as joint study group has been formed since 2006 for the treaty. Chile has developed a joint ventures in shipbuilding through ASMAR with a tanker and two tugboats were built in Kuching, Malaysia. While in the Malaysian side, a Malaysian car model of Proton has now been exported to Chile.

State visits 
On 19 April 2009, Yang di-Pertuan Agong, Sultan Mizan Zainal Abidin and Raja Permaisuri Agong, Tuanku Nur Zahirah made a first official visit to Chile and met with the President of Chile, Michelle Bachelet.

References 

 
Malaysia
Bilateral relations of Malaysia